In higher education in France the Centre régional des œuvres universitaires et scolaires (CROUS), founded in 1955, is a regional organisation providing student bursaries, university halls of residence, reception of foreign students, student cultural activities, and student restaurants. Accommodation is offered in all university cities, such as Paris, Nantes, Lyon, Toulouse, Bordeaux, Montpellier, Besançon, etc. For instance, the Grenoble education authority helps students find accommodation in the university cities of Grenoble, Chambéry, Valence and Annecy.

References

Education finance in France
Student culture in France